Tatiana Artmenko (born ) is an Israeli female former volleyball player, playing as a right side hitter. She was part of the Israel women's national volleyball team. She competed at the 2011 Women's European Volleyball Championship. On club level she played for Vk Prostějov.

References

External links
 profile at CEV
 profile at legavolleyfemminile

1976 births
Living people
Israeli women's volleyball players
Olympiacos Women's Volleyball players